Llan is a village in Powys, Wales, located on the B4518 road to Llanidloes,  from Llanbrynmair.

The parish church of St Mary is located here.

This area was the original centre of Llanbrynmair up to the early to mid 19th century. At this time the community relocated to its current location at the junction of the A470 & B4518 as a result of the new turnpike road opening (built in 1821) and the arrival of the railway in 1861.

References

Villages in Powys